Klęczkowo may refer to the following places in Poland:
Klęczkowo, Kuyavian-Pomeranian Voivodeship
Klęczkowo, Warmian-Masurian Voivodeship

See also
Kleczkowo, Masovian Voivodeship